Garikapati is one of the Indian family names; mostly in Andhra Pradesh.

 Garikapati Narasimha Rao is a well-known Telugu Avadhani  in Andhra Pradesh.
 Garikapati Sreenivasula Naidu is a well- known software engineer from anantapur.
  Garikapati Mohan Rao is a well- known Politician from AP.
 Garikapati Raja Rao, Telugu film director/actor/producer and doctor.   
 Garikapati  Varalakshmi was a veteran Telugu and Tamil actress, stage artist, singer and director.